is a fictional character in Japanese literature, cinema and TV. The popular series comprises numerous films and television dramas based on the original novel written by Jirō Osaragi.

1928 black and white Japanese silent film version with benshi accompaniment directed by Teppei Yamaguchi. It is a film which is a part of the series depicting the bold and daring hero Kurama Tengu.

Television
 Krama Tengu (1969–70) on NHK played by Hideki Takahashi
 Kurama Tengu (1990) played by Yūki Meguro

See also 
 Kurama Tengu: Kyōfu Jidai
 Kurama Tengu ōedo ihen, a 1950 film

References

External links
Kurama Tengu on Internet Movie Database

1928 films
Japanese silent films
1920s Japanese films
Japanese black-and-white films